OOTW may refer to:
 "Out of The Woods", 2014 song by Taylor Swift
 Operations Other Than War
 Out of This World (disambiguation)
 Outfit of the week
 Outlook on the web